The 2019–20 FC Erzgebirge Aue season was the 74th season in the football club's history. They competed in the 2. Bundesliga, the second tier of German football, in which they finished 7th, and the DFB-Pokal, where they were eliminated in the second round. They played their home matches at the Erzgebirgsstadion, located in Aue, Saxony, Germany.

Season summary 
Erzgebirge Aue finished 14th in the 2. Bundesliga during the 2018–19 season. On 26 August 2019, Dirk Schuster was appointed as the new head coach of Erzgebirge Aue. The club finished 7th on 47 points.

Players

First-team squad

Left club during season

Transfers

Transfers in

Loans in

Transfers out

Loans out

Friendly matches

Competitions

2. Bundesliga

League table

Results

DFB-Pokal

Notes

References

External links

FC Erzgebirge Aue seasons
Erzgebirge Aue